is a private university in Honchō, Nakano, Tokyo. Its nickname is Shadai (写大). It was formerly known as Tokyo College of Photography (Tōkyō Shashin Daigaku).

The university was founded as Konishi Professional School of Photography in Shibuya in 1923. The founder, Rokuemon Sugiura VII, was the president of Konishi Main Shop (later Konica) at that time and founded the school to fulfil the wish of Rokuemon Sugiura VI, the previous president.

Since 2007, the university has offered courses in manga studies and animation studies. Tokyo Polytechnic is also notable for being one of the few universities in Japan to have a game design department, with its faculty including such notable practitioners as Pac-Man creator Toru Iwatani and Xevious creator Masanobu Endō. The university also operates the Suginami Animation Museum, which focuses on the history and future of the animation industry in Japan.

Alumni
Akitaro Daichi
Eikoh Hosoe (photographer)
Yoko Kamio
Takashi Koizumi
Mouna Karray (photographer) 
Kōichi Saitō (film director)
Mutsuo Sugiura
Sakae Tamura (photographer)
Kenji Tsuruta
Shin Yanagisawa (photographer)

Academic staff
Yoshino Ōishi, photojournalist
Toru Iwatani, game designer, creator of Pac-Man
Masanobu Endō, game designer, creator of Xevious and The Tower of Druaga
Hideo Yoshizawa, game designer, known for work on Ninja Gaiden and Klonoa
Jun Hatanaka, manga and woodblock artist
Mitsuru Hongo, anime director
Yuu Miyake, game composer

Notes

External links
 Official website
 Japanese Official website

Universities and colleges in Tokyo
Private universities and colleges in Japan
Konica
Photography in Japan
Engineering universities and colleges in Japan
Western Metropolitan Area University Association